Live In Europe is a live album by Local H, which is composed of recordings made during the band's early 2017 European tour with Helmet. The album was released on February 6, 2018 in order to coincide with their 2018 European tour, and was released through G&P Records, the band's official merchandiser.

Track listing

Personnel
Scott Lucas - guitar, vocals
Ryan Harding - Drums
Randy Payne - layout, design
Eddie Applebaum - management
Andy Gerber - mixing
John Oakes - photography
Dave Lugo - recording

References

External links
 

2018 live albums
Local H albums